Triolein is a symmetrical triglyceride derived from glycerol and three units of the unsaturated fatty acid oleic acid.  Most triglycerides are unsymmetrical, being derived from mixtures of fatty acids. Triolein represents 4–30% of olive oil.

Triolein is also known as glyceryl trioleate and is one of the two components of Lorenzo's oil.

The oxidation of triolein is according to the formula:
 + 80  → 57  + 52 

References

Triglycerides